Terry Duane Kunze (born March 11, 1943) is a retired American professional basketball player. Kunze played in the 1967 season with the American Basketball Association's Minnesota Muskies after playing collegiately for the Minnesota Golden Gophers.  Kunze attended Duluth Central High School in Duluth, Minnesota.

Kunze was drafted by the St. Louis Hawks, but instead chose to pursue a career in Belgium.

In June 1978, Kunze was named the associate head coach of the East Carolina Pirates men's basketball team.

In 1991, Kunze began coaching at Anoka-Ramsey Community College.

External links
Player profile

References

1943 births
Living people
American expatriate basketball people in Belgium
American men's basketball players
Anoka-Ramsey Golden Rams men's basketball coaches
Basketball coaches from Minnesota
Basketball players from Minnesota
East Carolina Pirates men's basketball coaches
Minnesota Golden Gophers men's basketball coaches
Minnesota Golden Gophers men's basketball players
Minnesota Muskies players
Shooting guards
Sportspeople from Duluth, Minnesota
St. Louis Hawks draft picks
Women's Professional Basketball League coaches